Simon Philip Walter May is visiting professor of philosophy at King's College, London, and at Birkbeck College, University of London.

Selected publications
How to Be a Refugee.  Picador, 2021
Love: A History. Yale University Press, 2011.
Nietzsche's Ethics and his War on "Morality". Oxford University Press, 1999.
Nietzsche's On the Genealogy of Morality: A Critical Guide. Cambridge University Press, 2011. (Editor)
Nietzsche on Freedom and Autonomy. Oxford University Press, 2009. (Edited with Ken Gemes)
Thinking Aloud: A Collection of Aphorisms. Alma Books, 2009.

References

External links

Living people
Academics of Birkbeck, University of London
Academics of King's College London
Year of birth missing (living people)